The general speed limits in Kazakhstan are as follows:

References

Kazakhstan
Roads in Kazakhstan